Vladimir Yakovlevich Samoilov (1924–1999) was a  Soviet and Russian film and theater actor. People's Artist of the USSR (1984). Winner of the Stanislavsky State Prize    (1972), and two USSR State Prizes (1976, 1986).

Selected filmography 

 1959 —  Unrequited Duty as Zhgutov
 1960 — A Man with a Future as Professor Preobrazhensky
 1964 — Believe Me, People as Anokhin
 1967 — Wedding in Malinovka as  Nazar Duma, Red squadron commander
 1968 — Liberation as Divisional Commander Gromov
 1971 — Shadows at Noon as Arkady Arsentevich Klychkov, manufacturer and gold mines
 1972 — Investigation Held by ZnaToKi: Dinosaur as Sergei Mikheyev, a counterfeiter
 1973 — Stepmom as Viktor Vikentievich
 1974 — Earthly Love as Anisimov
 1974 —  Sokolovo as Lieutenant general
 1975 —  Bonus  as   Batarcev
 1976 —  The Days of the Turbins as Hetman Skoropadsky
 1977 —  Destiny  as   Anisimov
 1977 —  Soldiers of Freedom as Sergey Biryuzov
 1979 — Siberiade as Afanasy Ustyuzhanin
 1982 —  Niccolo Paganini as Borghese
 1987 — Visit to Minotaur as Vladimir Uvarov
 1990 — Sons of Bitches as Pyotr Yegorovich, Theater's Director
 1992 — Price of the Head as Jules Maigret
 2000 — Repete as Alexey Zykov

References

External links

1924 births
1999 deaths
Soviet male actors
Russian male actors
People from Odesa
 People's Artists of the USSR
People's Artists of the RSFSR
Honored Artists of the RSFSR
Recipients of the USSR State Prize
Burials at Vagankovo Cemetery